Pakour Arrondissement  is an arrondissement of the Vélingara Department in the Kolda Region of Senegal.

Subdivisions
The arrondissement is divided administratively into rural communities and in turn into villages.

References

External links
When a migrant drowns, a whole community feels the loss (The New Humanitarian, March 23, 2021)

Arrondissements of Senegal
Kolda Region